Swapnil Khadye is a cricketer who played for the Oman national cricket team. He made his List A debut for the Oman cricket team in their three-match series against the United Arab Emirates in October 2016. Later in the same month, he played for Oman in the 2016 ICC World Cricket League Division Four tournament. In January 2018, he was named in Oman's squad for the 2018 ICC World Cricket League Division Two tournament.

References

External links
 

Year of birth missing (living people)
Living people
Omani cricketers
Place of birth missing (living people)
Indian emigrants to Oman
Indian expatriates in Oman
Wicket-keepers